National Highway 135B, commonly referred to as NH 135B is a national highway in  India. It is a spur road of National Highway 35. NH-135B traverses the states of Uttar Pradesh and Madhya Pradesh in India.

Route 

Mau, Dabhoura, Sirmaur, Rewa.

Junctions  

  Terminal near Mau.
  near Sirmaur.
  near Rewa.

See also 

 List of National Highways in India
 List of National Highways in India by state

References

External links 

 NH 135B on OpenStreetMap

National highways in India
National Highways in Madhya Pradesh
National Highways in Uttar Pradesh
Mau district
Transport in Rewa, Madhya Pradesh